Ayvalıkgücü Belediyespor is a football club located in Balıkesir, Turkey. The team competes in the Turkish Regional Amateur League.

Ayvalıkgücü Belediyespor promoted to the TFF Third League after 2012–13 season.

League participations 
TFF Third League: 2013–present
Turkish Regional Amateur League: 2010–2013

Stadium 
Currently the team plays at the 5.000 capacity Hüsnü Uğural Stadı.

Current squad

References

External links 
Ayvalıkgücü Belediyespor on TFF.org

TFF Third League clubs
Football clubs in Turkey